Arvell is a given name. Notable people with the name include:

Arvell Jones, American comic book illustrator
Arvell Nelson (born 1988), American football player
Arvell Shaw (1923–2002), American jazz double-bassist

Masculine given names